The 2000 Indy Light season (more commonly known as the 2000 CART Dayton Indy Lights Championship) was the 15th season of Indy Lights. The season consisted of 12 races with all of the races being supporter races for the 2000 CART season. The season would be dominated by Kiwi driver, Scott Dixon who captured six race victories to win the championship by nine points over American driver, Townsend Bell with Casey Mears coming in third.

Calendar

Race summaries

Long Beach race
Held April 16 at Long Beach, California Street Course. Jonny Kane won the pole.

Top Five Results
17- Scott Dixon
3- Jason Bright
21- Felipe Giaffone
26- Jeff Simmons
2- Casey Mears

Milwaukee race
Held June 5 at The Milwaukee Mile. Scott Dixon won the pole.

Top Five Results
17- Scott Dixon
3- Jason Bright
7- Mario Domínguez
11- Chris Menninga
2- Casey Mears

Detroit race
Held June 18 at Belle Isle Raceway. Jonny Kane won the pole.

Top Five Results
27- Jonny Kane
21- Felipe Giaffone
2- Casey Mears
17- Scott Dixon
7- Mario Domínguez

Portland race
Held June 25 at Portland International Raceway. Townsend Bell won the pole.

Top Five Results
3- Jason Bright
1- Townsend Bell
26- Jeff Simmons
18- Tony Renna
11- Chris Menninga

Michigan race
Held July 22 at Michigan International Speedway. Felipe Giaffone won the pole.

Top Five Results
21- Felipe Giaffone
2- Casey Mears
18- Tony Renna
1- Townsend Bell
9- Todd Snyder

Chicago race
Held July 30 at The Chicago Motor Speedway. Chris Menninga won the pole.

Top Five Results
17- Scott Dixon
1- Townsend Bell
18- Tony Renna
21- Felipe Giaffone
10- Rodolfo Lavín, Jr.

Mid-Ohio race
Held August 13 at The Mid-Ohio Sports Car Course. Jason Bright won the pole.

Top Five Results
1- Townsend Bell
17- Scott Dixon
3- Jason Bright
18- Tony Renna
2- Casey Mears

Vancouver race
Held September 3 at Pacific Place. Felipe Giaffone won the pole.

Top Five Results
17- Scott Dixon
21- Felipe Giaffone
26- Jeff Simmons
1- Townsend Bell
7- Mario Domínguez

Laguna Seca race
Held September 10 at Mazda Raceway Laguna Seca. Casey Mears won the pole.

Top Five Results
17- Scott Dixon
1- Casey Mears
26- Jeff Simmons
18- Tony Renna
27- Jonny Kane

Gateway race
Held September 17 at The Gateway International Raceway. Townsend Bell won the pole.

Top Five Results
1- Townsend Bell
2- Casey Mears
3- Jason Bright
18- Tony Renna
11- Chris Menninga

Houston race
Held October 1 at The Houston Street Circuit. Casey Mears won the pole.

Top Five Results
2- Casey Mears
1- Townsend Bell
21- Felipe Giaffone
4- Geoff Boss
11- Chris Menninga

Fontana race
Held October 29 at The California Speedway. Felipe Giaffone won the pole.

Top Five Results
17- Scott Dixon
1- Townsend Bell
18- Tony Renna
2- Casey Mears
10- Rodolfo Lavín, Jr.

Final points standings

Driver

For every race the points were awarded: 20 points to the winner, 16 for runner-up, 14 for third place, 12 for fourth place, 10 for fifth place, 8 for sixth place, 6 seventh place, winding down to 1 points for 12th place. Additional points were awarded to the pole winner (1 point) and to the driver leading the most laps (1 point).

Complete Overview

R15=retired, but classified NS=did not start NT=no time set in qualifying

References 

Indy Lights seasons
Indy Lights Season, 2000
Indy Lights
Indy Lights